Jamuniya may refer to:

Jamuniya, Janakpur, Nepal
Jamuniya, Lumbini, Nepal